Antti Malin (born February 17, 1983) is a Finnish player of fantasy card-game Magic: The Gathering. Malin won the World Championship of the game in December 2008 in Memphis, Tennessee, United States. He is from the capital of Finland, Helsinki.

Malin is a long-time active scout, and has served as a board member in both local and national scouting organizations. Malin has studied at the Helsinki Business Polytechnic (Helia).

Magic: The Gathering TCG

Accomplishments

References

Magic: The Gathering players
Living people
1983 births
Sportspeople from Helsinki
Players who have won the Magic: The Gathering World Championship